Stock or Stöck is a surname of German origin. Notable people with the surname include:

 Albert Stock (1897–1969), Welsh international rugby player
 Alec Stock (1917–2001), English football manager
 Alejandro Stock (born 1965), Uruguayan artist
 Alfred Stock (1876–1946), German inorganic chemist
 Andrew Stock (born 1960), British artist
 Ann Stock, American government official
 Barbara Stock (born 1956), American actress
 Barry Stock (born 1974), Canadian guitarist
 Brian Stock (born 1981), Welsh footballer
 Christian Stock (1884–1967), German politician
 Constant Vanden Stock (1914–2008), Belgian footballer
 David Stock (born 1939), American composer
 Debra Stock (born 1962), English cricketer
 Dennis Stock (1928–2010), American photographer
 Dora Stock (1760–1832), German artist
 Elliot Stock (1838–1911), English publisher
 Emil Stock (1868–1951), Croatian industrialist and businessman 
 Francine Stock (born 1958), British journalist
 Frank Stock (born 1945), Hong Kong judge and lawyer
 Franz Stock (1904–1948), German priest in Paris during World War II
 Frederick Stock (1872–1942), German composer
 Gerhard Stöck (1911–1985), German athlete
 Gregory Stock, American biophysicist
 Hans-Christian Stock (1919–1945), German soldier
 Herb Stock (1899–1988), American football player
 James H. Stock (born 1956), American economist
 Jean-Pierre Stock (1900–1950), French rower
 Jeff Stock (born 1960), American soccer player
 Jon Stock (born 1966), British novelist
 Joseph Stock (disambiguation)
 Jürgen Stock (born 1959), German law enforcement officer
 Kathleen Stock (born 1972), British professor of philosophy
 Lady Gertrude Stock (1842–1893), English novelist
 Lara Stock (born 1992), Croatian chess player
 Larry Stock (1896–1984), American musician
 Leonhard Stock (born 1958), Austrian skier
 Lionello Stock (1866–1948), Croatian-Italian industrialist, businessman
 Marcus Stock, tenth Roman Catholic Bishop of Leeds
 Mark Stock (born 1951), American painter
 Mark Stock (American football) (born 1966), American football player

 Mike Stock (American football), American football coach
 Mike Stock (musician) (born 1951), English musician
 Milt Stock (1897–1977), American baseball player
 Nigel Stock (actor) (1919–1986), British actor
 Nigel Stock (bishop) (born 1950), British bishop
 P. J. Stock (born 1975), American hockey player
 Raymond Stock, American translator
 Reinhard Stock (born 1938), German nuclear physicist
 Richard Stock (1569–1626), English clergyman
 Robert Alfred Stock (fl. 1880s), founding managing director of the South Australian Brewing Company
 Robert Stock (baseball) (born 1989), American baseball player
 Roger Vanden Stock, Belgian footballer
 Ryan Stock, Canadian stunt man
 Sarah Stock (born 1979), Canadian wrestler
 Sebastian Stock (born 1977), German curler
 Simon Stock (1165–1265), 13th century English saint
 Thomas Stock (1750–1803), English clergyman
 Uwe Stock (born 1947), German judoka who competed in the 1970 European Championships
 Valentine Stock (1852–1921), Canadian politician
 Victor Andrew Stock (born 1944), British clergyman
 Wes Stock (born 1934), American baseball player
 Wolfgang Stock (born 1959), German journalist

Related surnames 
 Stocken
 Stocker
 Stöcker
 Stok
 Stocks (surname)
 Stokel

Toponymic surnames
German-language surnames